MOW may refer to:
 Maintenance of way, the maintenance of railroad right of way
 Mercer Oliver Wyman, now part of Oliver Wyman, a management consulting firm
 Movie of the Week, a television movie
 March on Washington, a mass political action
 Movement for the Ordination of Women, an Australian movement supporting the ordination of women in the Anglican Church of Australia
 Museum de Oude Wolden, a regional art museum in Bellingwolde in the Netherlands
 The Mobility and Public Works policy area of the Flemish Government

It is also the IATA designation of Moscow area airports:
Sheremetyevo International Airport
Domodedovo International Airport
Vnukovo International Airport
Zhukovsky International Airport